Barberton High School is a public high school in Barberton, Ohio, United States.  It is the only high school in the Barberton City School District, serving 1,421 students in grades 9-12 as of the 2018–19 school year.

State championships

 Boys' basketball – 1976 
 Boys' track and field – 1954 
http://www.massillontigers.com/statistics/1947/np_barberton_47.htm

Notable alumni
 Bob Addis, former professional baseball player in Major League Baseball 
 John Cominsky, professional football player in the National Football League 
 Glenn "Jeep" Davis, three-time Olympic Gold Medal winner in track and field; five-time world record holder in track and field; professional football player in the National Football League 
 Tom Dimitroff, Sr., professional football player and coach
 Frank Goettge, decorated Marine of both World Wars
 Roger Hoover, songwriter and guitarist
 George Izo, former professional football player in the NFL
 David M. Kelley, founder of IDEO
 Scot Loeffler, football coach
 John Mackovic, head football coach of the Kansas City Chiefs
 Hal Naragon, former professional baseball player in MLB
 Lawrence Ricks, former professional football player in the NFL
 Alvin Robertson, former player in NBA; Olympic gold medalist
 Kenny Robertson, college basketball standout
 Sassy Stephie, professional wrestler
 Bo Schembechler, head football coach at the University of Michigan, 1969–1989
 Betty Sutton, member of the United States House of Representatives from Ohio's 13th congressional district, 2007–2013
 Bob Toneff, former professional football player in the NFL
 Joe Williams, football player
 Howard Woodford, recipient of the Medal of Honor

References

External links
 
 
 Barberton City School District website
 

High schools in Summit County, Ohio
Public high schools in Ohio